Hierangela doxanthes is a moth in the family Gelechiidae. It was described by Edward Meyrick in 1929. It is found on New Guinea.

The wingspan is about 14 mm. The forewings are clear yellow with an oblique wedge-shaped crimson spot on the dorsum towards the base and an irregular crimson streak from the base beneath the costa through the middle of the disc to the termen beneath the apex, connected beneath by a blackish-grey mark before the middle with an elongate wedge-shaped crimson spot lying along the middle of the dorsum, slightly interrupted about the middle and more strongly at three-fourths. There is a blackish dot beneath the costa at two-fifths, and a short fine longitudinal line at four-fifths, connected by a crimson dash with a median streak on the termen. An inwards-oblique crimson streak is found from the tornus to beneath the median streak at two-thirds and there is a crimson terminal streak marked with a blackish dot beneath the apex. The hindwings are pale rosy pink, the basal two-fifths are grey whitish.

References

Gelechiinae
Moths described in 1929